The 2003–04 Northern Premier League season was the 36th in the history of the Northern Premier League, a football competition in England. Teams were divided into two divisions; the Premier and the First. This season was the last before the formation of the Conference North and the Conference South, so most of the Premier Division teams were promoted to the Conference North for next season. Subsequently, the First Division had most of its teams promoted to the Premier Division, with new teams admitted from the leagues just below the Northern Premier in the English football league system, although the league reform meant that the "promoted" clubs remained in the same tier within the English football league system, and further meant that while there was no relegation within the NPL itself, those clubs that missed out on promotion nevertheless had their position within the league system downgraded by one tier.

During this season, Radcliffe Borough's Jody Banim broke the English record for the most consecutive games where a player has scored at least one goal, which ran from 9 September to 4 November.

Premier Division

The Premier Division featured four new teams:
 Southport relegated from the Football Conference
 Alfreton Town promoted as champions of Division One
 Spennymoor United promoted as runner-up of Division One
 Radcliffe Borough promoted as via playoff from Division One

League table

Results

Play-offs
Eight teams competed for the final Conference North place; including Hyde United, champions of Division One.

Division One 

Division One featured five new teams:

 Colwyn Bay relegated from the Premier Division
 Gateshead relegated via Playoff from the Premier Division
 Hyde United relegated from the Premier Division
 Bridlington Town as champions of the Northern Counties East League Premier Division
 Prescot Cables as champions of the North West Counties League Division One

League table

Results

Promotion and relegation 

In the thirty-sixth season of the Northern Premier League the top fourteen teams of the Premier Division plus Bradford Park Avenue were promoted to the newly formed Conference North. They were replaced by the top fourteen teams of the First Division, who in turn were replaced by the following fourteen teams:

 Gresley Rovers (from the Southern League Western Division)
 Shepshed Dynamo (from the Southern League Western Division)
 Ilkeston Town (from the Southern League Western Division)
 Willenhall Town
 Eastwood Town
 Mossley
 Rocester
 A.F.C. Telford United
 Brigg Town
 Warrington Town
 Ossett Albion
 Clitheroe
 Woodley Sports
 Spalding United

While no teams were relegated this season, the league reform meant the teams that missed out on "promotion" remained in a league that had its position in the English football league system downgraded by one tier while the "promoted" teams actually remained on the same level of the league system.

Cup results
Challenge Cup: Teams from both leagues.

Droylsden bt. Hucknall Town

President's Cup: 'Plate' competition for losing teams in the NPL Cup.

Barrow bt. Workington

Chairman's Cup: 'Plate' competition for losing teams in the NPL Cup.

Hyde United bt. Leek Town

Peter Swales Shield: Between Champions of NPL Premier Division and Winners of the NPL Cup.

Droylsden bt. Hucknall Town

See also
Northern Premier League
2003–04 Southern Football League
2003–04 Isthmian League

External links 
 Northern Premier League Tables at RSSSF

Northern Premier League seasons
6